Humberto Gómez Landero (1904–1968) was a Mexican screenwriter and film director.

Selected filmography

Screenwriter
 Horse for Horse (1939)
 In the Times of Don Porfirio (1940)

Director
The Disobedient Son (1945)
 The Noiseless Dead (1946)
 The Lost Child (1947)
 Music Inside (1947)
 Music, Poetry and Madness (1948)
 Our Hateful Husbands (1962)

References

Bibliography
 Daniel Balderston, Mike Gonzalez & Ana M. Lopez. Encyclopedia of Contemporary Latin American and Caribbean Cultures. Routledge, 2002.

External links

1904 births
1968 deaths
Mexican film directors
Writers from Veracruz
People from Orizaba
20th-century Mexican screenwriters
20th-century Mexican male writers